Daniel Okyere Donkor popularly known with his stage name Mizter Okyere is a Ghanaian saxophonist and producer. In 2019, he was awarded the Best Instrumentalist of the Year at the Vodafone Ghana Music Awards.

Early life and career 
Mizter Okyere was born in Kumasi in the Ashanti Region of Ghana and the first of three children. He completed St. Mary's Anglican JHS and KNUST Senior High School for his second cycle education. Upon completion, he furthered his education at NIIT where he studied Networking and Computer Programming.

Career 
Mizter Okyere who was formally called Bigdee started his music career from church as an instrumentalist and through that established his own recording studio Bigdee Beat Studio currently called Mizter Okyere Music Studio.

Notable performances 
Mizter Okyere has performed on stages like Rhythms on the Runway, Takoradi Music Awards, African Legends Night, Rapperholic, Vodafone Ghana Music Awards, Ghana Meets Naija, Miss Universe Ghana, Easter Comedy Show, MMC Live, Ghana Beverage Awards, Glo Mega Music Show, Bhim Concert, Glitz Style Awards, 3G Awards, Emy Awards, GUBA Awards, NPP Loyal Ladies Cook Out and has also performed alongside Samini , Sarkodie, Stonebwoy, Becca et al.

Award and nomination

References 

Year of birth missing (living people)
Living people
Ghanaian record producers